Saeed Aghakhani (born February 23, 1972) is an Iranian actor. He has received various accolades, including a Crystal Simorgh, two Iran's Film Critics and Writers Association Awards and a Duhok International Film Festival Award.

Filmography

Film

Television

Web

References

External links
 
 Saeed Aghakhani at Iranian Movie DataBase

1972 births
Living people
Iranian comedians
Iranian Kurdish people
Iranian film directors
Iranian screenwriters
Kurdish male actors
Iranian male writers
Iranian male film actors
University of Tehran alumni
Iranian television directors
Iranian male television actors
Crystal Simorgh for Best Actor winners